Women In Blue is a 2021 documentary film. The film follows four women who worked for the Minneapolis Police Department. The four officers describe the differences between how male officers and female officers conduct themselves.

The film was directed by Deirdre Fishel.

References

External links
Women in Blue (2021) - IMDb

2021 documentary films